José Segundo Decoud Domecq (14 May 1848 – 3 March 1909) was a Paraguayan politician, journalist, diplomat and military officer. He is often considered one of the foremost intellectuals of his generation, and was also one of the first liberals of the country. Decoud was one of the founders of the long-standing Colorado Party, having been its first vice-president and having written its founding instrument.

Biography

Early life 
Segundo Decoud was born in Asunción on 14 May 1848 to Juan Francisco Decoud and Maria Luisa Concepción Domecq during Carlos Antonio López's rule. The Decouds were historically strong opponents to the López regime, and in the early 1850s the execution of his uncles Teodoro and Gregorio due to treason forced his family into exile.

Together with his brother Juan José, he studied at the Colegio del Uruguay in Entre Ríos, Argentina and later joined the law school at the University of Buenos Aires. With the outbreak of the Paraguayan War, however, he abandoned his studies and enlisted into the Paraguayan Legion, a military unit formed out of oppositionists of Francisco Solano López in Buenos Aires in 1865, though he left the unit before the war ended. By the end of the war, his father was one of the unit’s commanders.

Political life 
Months before the war was over, and with the chief Brazilian diplomat Silva Paranhos' approval, soon the new Paraguayan politics began to form. On 26 June 1869, the Club del Pueblo was formed with Segundo as a secretary. The club was a liberal political organization mostly composed by former member of the Paraguayan Legion and other dissenters to the López regime. Already being an important figure in postwar Asunción due to his name and ideas, Decoud was named one of the members of the constitutional assembly that created the 1870 Constitution, and in 1871 was made minister of Foreign Affairs for the Cirilo Rivarola's government. Afterwards, as Paraguayan politics took a violent turn, Decoud withdrew temporarily from it to focus on his career as a journalist, and returned only in 1878 as minister for the Candido Bareiro government. The 1880s were the years in which he was the most active and had the greatest impact upon Paraguayan politics.

One of his most important feats was achieved in 1885, when he went to London as an extraordinary envoy and managed to renegotiate Paraguay’s debt there from little short of 3 million pounds sterling to 850 thousand, though the country had to cede 8,700 km2 of land to the bondholders in exchange. As a diplomat, he also represented Paraguay as ambassador to the Empire of Brazil and to the Uruguayan government. Besides this, he was one of the founders, alongside ex-president Bernardino Caballero and others, of the Colorado Party in 1887, to which he contributed many years as its main ideologue. The foundation of the country’s first university, the Universidad Nacional de Asunción, was in good part motivated by him, as well.

Some controversies marked his career. He was one of the foremost advocates for the process of land sales by the government conducted from 1883 onwards, which served to concentrate land ownership rapidly and which had a short-lived impact in the country’s finances; he also was accused of having plotted with Argentine authorities in the 1870s to allow for Paraguay’s annexation to the former country. In the 1890s he would still occupy many cabinet positions and was considered for the presidency, but intrigues kept him from power, as they had more than once done in the decades before.

Journalistic career
José Segundo Decoud began his career in press soon after his return to Paraguay. Together with his brother Héctor Decoud, he started to work as editor and writer for the newspaper La Regeneración in 1869, which lasted until september 1870. Throughout the 1870s and 1880s he contributed to other newspapers such as La Reforma and La Opinión Pública. His impactful texts were frequently republished in Argentine newspapers. Decoud also translated Joseph Alden's The Science of Government in Connection with American Institutions to Spanish, and wrote books such as Recuerdos históricos, La amistad, Cuestiones Políticas y Económicas, edited in 1876, and El patriotismo, published in 1905. When he died, in 1909, it is said that he had been preparing for some years to write a book that would discuss Paraguayan history from the colonial era to his time.

In 2014, the historian and diplomat Ricardo Scavone Yegros made a compilation of Decoud’s works and published them together with a critical study.

Death
Decoud committed suicide in Asunción on March 1909. His suicide letter to his wife can be read in  Una relación compleja, Paraguay y Brasil 1889-1954.

References

Citations

Sources

 
 
 
 
 
 
 
 
 
 
 

1848 births
1909 deaths
People from Asunción
Paraguayan judges
Finance Ministers of Paraguay
People of the Paraguayan War
Colorado Party (Paraguay) politicians